Cimișlia is a district in southern Moldova, situated between the capital of Chișinău and the autonomous territorial unit of Gagauzia, with its administrative center being the town of Cimișlia. On 1 January 2011, its population was officially recorded to be 61,700.

History
The earliest documented locations are Sagaidac, Javgur and Gura Galbenei, first mentioned from 1605 to 1670. The district was settled by Moldovans, unlike Leova District to the west. During the 17th and 18th centuries agriculture (primarily wine-making) predominated, with a significant increase in population. In 1812, after the Russo-Turkish War, Bessarabia was released Russian Empire until 1917. In 1918, after the collapse of the Russian Empire, Bessarabia united with Romania; from 1918–1940 and 1941–1944, the district was part of Lăpușna County. In 1940, following the Molotov-Ribbentrop Treaty, Bessarabia was released the Soviet Union. In 1991, as a result of the independence of Moldova, the district was part of Lăpușna County until 2003 (when it became an administrative unit of Moldova).

Geography
The district is located in the southern Republic of Moldova. It is bordered by Hîncești District and Ialoveni District on the north, Căușeni District on the east and Gagauzia, Basarabeasca District and the Ukraine border on the south. Erosion is not a serious problem.

Climate

Fauna
The district has typical European fauna, with mammals such as foxes, hedgehogs, deer, wild boar, polecat, wild cat and ermine. Birds include partridge, crows, eagles, starlings and swallows.

Flora
Forests of the district include oak, ash, hornbeam, linden, maple and walnut. Plants include wormwood, knotweed, fescue and nettles.

Water
The district is in the Black Sea basin, and the main river is the  Cogâlnic. Most lakes are man-made.

Administrative subdivisions

Localities: 39
Administrative center: Cimişlia
City: Cimişlia
Communes: 16
Villages: 22

Demographics
On 1 January 2012 the district's population was 61,300, of which 23.2 percent was urban and 76.8 percent was rural.

Births (2010): 570 (9.2 per 1000)
Deaths (2010): 830 (13.4 per 1000)
Growth rate (2010): -260 (-4.2 per 1000)

Ethnic groups 

Footnote: * There is an ongoing controversy regarding the ethnic identification of Moldovans and Romanians.

Religion 
Christians - 98.0%
Orthodox Christians - 96.0%
Protestant - 2.0%
Seventh-day Adventists - 1.2%
Baptists - 0.8%
Other - 1.2%
None 0.8%

Economy
The district has 10,856 registered businesses. Agricultural land comprises , 59.6 percent of the total land area. Orchards make up  (2.5 percent), vineyards  (7 percent) and pastures  (12.9 percent of total area).

Education
The district has 34 schools, with a total enrollment of 9,079 children (including 300 professional school students).
There are 740 teachers.

Politics
The district favors centre-right parties, particularly the AEI (which has increased 120.7 percent in support in the last three elections). The PCRM has lost ground in the last three elections.

Elections

|-
!style="background-color:#E9E9E9" align=center colspan="2" valign=center|Parties and coalitions
!style="background-color:#E9E9E9" align=right|Votes
!style="background-color:#E9E9E9" align=right|%
!style="background-color:#E9E9E9" align=right|+/−
|-
| 
|align=left|Party of Communists of the Republic of Moldova
|align="right"|10,084
|align="right"|38.89
|align="right"|−5.09
|-
| 
|align=left|Liberal Democratic Party of Moldova
|align="right"|8,738
|align="right"|33.70
|align="right"|+17.19
|-
| 
|align=left|Democratic Party of Moldova
|align="right"|4,003
|align="right"|15,44
|align="right"|-0.66
|-
| 
|align=left|Liberal Party
|align="right"|1,805
|align="right"|6.96
|align="right"|−2.37
|-
|bgcolor=#0033cc|
|align=left|European Action Movement
|align="right"|266
|align="right"|1.03
|align="right"|+1.03
|-
|bgcolor="grey"|
|align=left|Other parties
|align="right"|1,271
|align="right"|3.98
|align="right"|-10.10
|-
|align=left style="background-color:#E9E9E9" colspan="2"|Total (turnout 57.25%)
|width="30" align="right" style="background-color:#E9E9E9"|26,191
|width="30" align="right" style="background-color:#E9E9E9"|100.00
|width="30" align="right" style="background-color:#E9E9E9"|

Culture
The district has a museum, 15 works of art, 14 musical ensembles and 39 public libraries.

Healthcare
The district has a 200-bed hospital, a 14-office family-practice center and six health centers. There are 65 doctors, 217 personal-care aides and 115 auxiliary medical personnel.

See also
 Discuție:Raionul Cimișlia

References

 Rezultatele alegerilor din 28 noiembrie 2010 în raionul Cimişlia 

 
Districts of Moldova